The conga line is a novelty line dance that was derived from the Cuban carnival dance of the same name and became popular in the US in the 1930s and 1950s. In order to perform the dance, dancers form a long, processing line, which would usually turn into a circle. It has three shuffle steps on the beat, followed by a kick that is slightly ahead of the fourth beat. The conga, a term sometimes mistakenly believed to be derived from the African region of Congo, is both a lyrical and danceable genre, rooted in the music of carnival troupes or comparsas.

Origin
The conga dance was believed to have been brought over from Africa by enslaved people in the West Indies, and became a popular street dance in Cuba. The style was appropriated by politicians during the early years of republic in an attempt to appeal to the masses before election. During Gerardo Machado's dictatorship in Cuba, Havana citizens were forbidden to dance the conga since rival groups would work themselves to high excitement and start street fights. This was not the case when Fulgencio Batista became president in the 1940s - he permitted people to dance congas during elections, but a police permit was required.

Description
The conga dance style is more of a march, which is characterized by its distinctive conga drum rhythm. It differs from the Cuban rumba, which uses movements considered "hip" and shows the sensually aggressive attitude of each dancer. Conga music is played with a staccato beat as its base, which gives rhythm to the movements of the dancers. Conga dancers lift their legs in time with the rhythm of the music, marking each beat with the strong motion of their body.

The basic dance steps start from left leg 1-2-3 kick then repeat, opposite. Originally, a band member wearing a drum would venture onto the dance floor and begin zig-zagging around while drumming out the rhythm. Dancers would start joining up behind the drummer, forming a line that moves like a snake in an open circle. The line (or the circular chain) would grow longer and the drumming more intense until it finally stopped. The dance has two styles, which is a single line form and partners. The single line is more popular in Cuba.

Western popularity 
Beginning in the late 1930s, the dance became popular in the United States; however, in the 1940s, it became very popular due to Hollywood's "Latin" musicals. RKO Pictures' offerings were particularly influential, notably Too Many Girls (1940), in which Desi Arnaz appeared as a conga-playing Argentine student. Spanish-Catalan bandleader Xavier Cugat, who gave Arnaz his musical start, helped to popularize the dance, but the biggest impact belonged to Arnaz himself. It is prominently featured in the 1941 Deanna Durbin film, It Started With Eve, in which Durbin and Charles Laughton dance the dance together in a nightclub.

With its simple march step, the interlinking of dancers circling about in single file, and one-two-three-bump rhythm with the fourth beat strongly marked, the dance was not only attractive but also readily accessible to US and other foreign audiences. The dance started to gain a foothold in the US around 1929, when the original La Conga nightclub opened its doors in Manhattan. It is believed that the La Conga was at Broadway and 51st Street. By 1937, the conga was well known in New York.

The widespread popularity of the dance resulted in many cultural references in contemporary media. For example, the conga line was a recurring theme in Warner Bros. animated cartoons of the 1940s.

This music and dance form has become totally assimilated into Cuba's musical heritage and has been used in many film soundtracks in the US and Mexico. One of the earliest and most successful of 20th-century Cuban musical exports, the conga lacked the polyrhythmic sophistication of the son, mambo, or salsa but served to nurture the future receptivity of an international public to the wider gamut of Cuban musical styles.

In popular culture 
In the 1950 Malayan movie entitled "Twin Sisters (Kembar?)", in the opening scene, a conga line is performed by the guests in a party scene. 

The 1955 musical film adaptation of My Sister Eileen features a conga line as a recurring gag.  

In the 1963 film Billy Liar, a scene at the Locarno Dance Hall in Manchester features the conga line.

In 1984 the British band Black Lace reached number ten in the UK charts with the song "Do the Conga".

In 1985 the Cuban-American band Miami Sound Machine reached number ten on the US Billboard Hot 100 with the song "Conga".

The long-time jingle for Dad's Old-Fashioned Root Beer employed a conga beat.

The weekly fundraising event held by the charitable organisation Phone Credit For Refugees every Friday is based around the formation of a virtual conga line.

See also 
 Bunny hop
 Letkajenkka
 Polonaise

References

Further reading 
 Dale A. Olsen, Daniel E. Sheehy. The Garland Encyclopedia of World Music. Garland Publishing: New York and London, 1998. 825.
 Roberts, John Storm. The Latin Tinge. 2nd ed. New York: Oxford University Press, 1999.

Conga (music)
Dance in Cuba
Novelty and fad dances
Group dances
Line dances
Circle dances